The 2022 Tiburon Challenger was a professional tennis tournament played on outdoor hard courts. It was the fourteenth edition of the tournament which was part of the 2022 ATP Challenger Tour. It took place in Tiburon, United States between 3 and 9 October 2022.

Singles main draw entrants

Seeds

 1 Rankings are as of September 26, 2022.

Other entrants
The following players received wildcards into the singles main draw:
  Jonas Eriksson Ziverts
  Patrick Kypson
  Sam Riffice

The following players received entry into the singles main draw as alternates:
  Benjamin Lock
  Giovanni Oradini
  Michail Pervolarakis

The following players received entry from the qualifying draw:
  Nick Chappell
  August Holmgren
  Evan King
  Christian Langmo
  Alex Michelsen
  Luke Saville

Champions

Singles

 Zachary Svajda def.  Ben Shelton 2–6, 6–2, 6–4.

Doubles

 Leandro Riedi /  Valentin Vacherot def.  Ezekiel Clark /  Alfredo Perez 6–7(2–7), 6–3, [10–2].

References

Tiburon Challenger
2022
2022 in American tennis
October 2022 sports events in the United States
2022 in sports in California